Edgar Weeks (August 3, 1839 – December 17, 1904) was a military officer, judge and politician from the U.S. state of Michigan.

Biography
Weeks was born in Mount Clemens, Michigan, where he attended the public schools and learned the printing trade. He studied law and was admitted to the bar in January 1861.

During the Civil War, he served in Company B, Fifth Regiment, Michigan Volunteer Infantry, and was first sergeant of the company.  He became first lieutenant and adjutant of the Twenty-second Michigan Infantry in 1862 and captain in 1863. He was appointed assistant inspector general of the Third Brigade, Second Division, Reserve Corps, Army of the Cumberland, in 1863 and was mustered out in December 1863.

After the war, he was proprietor and editor of a Republican newspaper in Mount Clemens and commenced the practice of law in Mount Clemens in 1866. He served as prosecuting attorney 1867-1870 and then as judge of probate of Macomb County, 1870-1876.

He was an unsuccessful candidate for election in 1884 to the 49th United States Congress, but in 1898 was elected as a Republican from Michigan's 7th congressional district to the 56th Congress. He was re-elected to the 57th Congress, serving from March 4, 1899 to March 3, 1903. He was chair of the Committee on Elections No. 3 in the 57th Congress. He was an unsuccessful candidate for renomination in 1902, losing in the Republican primary election to Henry McMorran, who went on to be elected to fill Weeks's seat in the House.

Edgar Weeks resumed the practice of law and died at the age of sixty-five in Mount Clemens, where he is interred in the Clinton Grove Cemetery.

Edgar Weeks' cousin, John W. Weeks, was a U.S. Representative and U.S. Senator from Massachusetts, and U.S. Secretary of War under Presidents Warren G. Harding and Calvin Coolidge.

References
 Retrieved on 2008-02-15
The Political Graveyard

External link

1839 births
1904 deaths
Union Army officers
Michigan lawyers
Burials in Michigan
Editors of Michigan newspapers
Republican Party members of the United States House of Representatives from Michigan
19th-century American lawyers
People from Mount Clemens, Michigan
19th-century American newspaper editors
19th-century American judges
19th-century American politicians
20th-century American politicians